The 2019 ESF Women's Championship was an international European softball competition that was held in Ostrava and Frýdek-Místek, Czech Republic; and Rybnik and Żory, Poland from 30 June to 6 July 2019.

Preliminary Round

Group A

Game originally scheduled: July 1, 2019, 18:00 at Ostrava 2, postponed due to rain

Game originally scheduled: July 1, 2019, 20:45 at Ostrava 1, postponed due to rain

Group B

Game originally scheduled: July 1, 2019, 16:15 at Frýdek-Místek, postponed due to rain

Game originally scheduled: July 1, 2019, 20:15 at Ostrava 2, postponed due to rain

Group C

Game originally scheduled: July 1, 2019, 18:30 at Frýdek-Místek, postponed due to rain

Game originally scheduled: July 1, 2019, 18:30 at Ostrava 1, postponed due to rain

Group D

Semifinal Round

Group E

Group F

7th Place Game

Final Round

Group X

Bronze

Final

Consolidation Round 9th-16th Place

Group G

Group H

9th Place Game

11th Place Game

13th Place Game

15th Place Game

Consolidation Round 17th-23rd Place

Group I

Final standings

References

European Championship
Women's Softball European Championship
Womens Softball European Championship
Womens Softball European Championship
International sports competitions hosted by the Czech Republic
International sports competitions hosted by Poland
Softball competitions in the Czech Republic
Softball in Poland
ESF Women's Championship
ESF Women's Championship